Enercoop is a French electric utility cooperative company. It uses only renewable energy and is the only electric utility in France to be a cooperative. Its founding members include Greenpeace and other proponents of environmental protection and the ethical economy, such as La Nef, a French cooperative bank and the Friends of the Earth association.
As of mid-2014, Enercoop has  clients

History
Enercoop was created in 2005 and initially, as the French electricity market wasn't yet liberalized, Enercoop just had companies as customers. Later on, in 2007, as the market was liberalized, Enercoop started to grow and totalized more than  customers.

In 2014, Enercoop had  customers.

As of 2021, Enercoop had  customers

Objectives
Its aim is to create many regional cooperatives around France where the local members can be in charge of all parts of the energy process from production to consumption. In this way the group intends to make citizens responsible for the energy they consume. Actually, in 2014, it has 6 regional cooperatives.

Enercoop's articles of association impose that at least 57% of the profits must be reinvested in means of electricity production. The remaining profits can either be reinvested or can reward its investors.

References

External links

 

Energy cooperatives
Renewable energy companies of France
French companies established in 2005
Energy companies established in 2005
Renewable resource companies established in 2005
Cooperatives in France